is a Japanese multinational corporation and a major producer of machinery components and electronics devices. As of June 30, 2019, MinebeaMitsumi comprises 121 consolidated subsidiaries and affiliates. NMB (USA) Inc. (Nippon Miniature Bearing) is an American holding company that manages Minebea's American subsidiaries.

MinebeaMitsumi shares are listed on the Tokyo Stock Exchange and the Osaka Securities Exchange, the company is a constituent of the Nikkei 225 stock index.

On January 27, 2017, Minebea acquired Mitsumi for $500 million and changed its name to MinebeaMitsumi.

Minebea has the world's largest shares in 6 product areas such as ball bearings (65%) and pivot assemblies (65%).

International Asian business accounts for 80% of Minebea's production and 50% of its sales.

Major businesses and subsidiaries

NMB Technologies Corporation
NMB  deals in manufacturing of:

 Bearings
 Bearing-related products:
 pivot assemblies, precision mechanical assemblies
 Machined components
 Defence-related special components (exclusively to the Japan Ministry of Defense)
 Electronic devices & components
 Measuring components
Strain gauges, force sensors, pressure sensors, vector sensors
 Load cells, pressure cells, torque transducers, digital indicators, tensile and compression testing machines
 Fan motors, blowers, high-pressure blowers, fan units
 Hybrid type stepping motors, Pulse Modulation (PM) stepping motors, small diameter/high-speed PM stepping motors
 Brush DC motors, small brushless motors, powerful brushless motors, polygon mirror scanner motors
 HDD spindle motors, rotation angle sensors, Fluidized bed dryer(FBD) motors

In August 2015, a Minebea product gained an entry in the Guinness World Records for being the smallest commercially available mass-produced steel ball bearing in the world. The product concerned was first introduced in 2009, and is primarily used by domestic watchmakers in a number of high-grade mechanical watches to support delicate axles, instead of traditionally used jewels.

Mitsumi Electric 

Mitsumi's product portfolio includes:

 Integrated circuits
 Power supplies
 Alternating current adaptors
 Chargers
 Internal power supplies
 High-frequency devices
 Communication equipment
 Internet protocol equipment

ABLIC Inc 

ABLIC Inc was acquired by MinebeaMitsumi in 2019.
 Power Management ICs
 Sensors
 Memory
 Amplifiers
 Automotive ICs
 Healthcare

U-Shin 
U-Shin was in 1926 and a has been a subsidiary of MinebeaMitsumi since 2019. It has R&D centres in the US, India, Germany, France. The capital as of March 2021 is 15,206 (million yen) and the consolidated sales stand at 105,133(million yen). U-Shin is headquartered at Minato-ku, Tokyo.U-Shin deals in the following:
 Automotive Division
 Electronic devices
 Electronic steering column locks
 Climate control systems
 Latches
 Power closure system
 Car flush handles
 Switches and sensors
 Locksets 
 Industrial Equipment Division
 Fuel pumps

Paradox Engineering 

Paradox Engineering is MinebeaMitsumi's R&D center for the Internet of Things. The company is based in Switzerland and develops IoT solutions for cities and other smart environments. 

Paradox Engineering has a Central Management System of choice for all Cities using PE Smart Urban Network to manage and control Wireless IoT applications – Smart Lighting, Smart Parking, Smart Energy and any other sensor-based application – and Wireless High speed loT services – pervasive Wi-Fi, video surveillance, emergency response systems.

Major shareholders 
(top 10 shareholders, as of September 30, 2013)
 Japan Trustee Services Bank, Ltd. (Trust Account) – 31,364,000 – 8.29%
 The Master Trust Bank of Japan, Ltd. (Trust Account) – 27,583,000 – 7.29%
 National Mutual Insurance Federation of Agricultural Cooperatives – 15,761,000 – 4.17%
 Takahashi Industrial and Economic Research Foundation – 15,447,330 – 4.08%
 Sumitomo Mitsui Trust Bank, Limited – 15,349,000 – 4.06%
 Keiaisha Co., Ltd. – 15,000,000 – 3.97%
 Japan Trustee Services Bank, Ltd. (Trust Account 4) – 13,081,000 – 3.46%
 Japan Trustee Services Bank, Ltd. (Trust Account 9) – 11,501,000 – 3.04%
 The Bank of Tokyo-Mitsubishi UFJ, Ltd. – 10,057,839 – 2.66%
 Sumitomo Mitsui Banking Corporation – 10,000,475 – 2.64%

See also
 Hi-Tek Corporation
 Minebea Mitsumi FC

References

External links 

 Official global site 

Electronics companies of Japan
Firearm manufacturers of Japan
Defense companies of Japan
Companies based in Nagano Prefecture
Manufacturing companies based in Tokyo
Companies listed on the Tokyo Stock Exchange
Companies listed on the Osaka Exchange
Companies listed on the Nagoya Stock Exchange
Manufacturing companies established in 1951
Japanese companies established in 1951